Natale sul Nilo (Christmas on the Nile) is a 2002 Italian comedy film directed by Neri Parenti. In Italy the film was a huge commercial success, grossing 28,302,293 euros.

Plot 
The Roman lawyer Fabio Ciulla (Cristian De Sica) goes on holiday to Egypt. He is pursuing his wife, whom he has repeatedly cheated on, in an attempt to persuade her to forgive him. The police sergeant Enrico Ombroni (Massimo Boldi) also travels to the land of the Pharaohs with a guard (Biagio Izzo) to get his young daughter (Lucrezia Piaggio) away from a musical group of which she is a fan. The two protagonists meet in Egypt for an exchange of misunderstandings, since Ciulla by mistake has a love affair with a young girl while his wife forgives him. The girl is engaged to the son of Ciulla, who plans to get rid of the tangle by a clever ruse. Meanwhile Ombroni's daughter runs away with the crew of her favorite musical group, who have come to Egypt to shoot an exotic video.

Cast 
 Christian De Sica: Avv. Fabio Ciulla
 Massimo Boldi: Gen. Enrico Ombroni
 Fichi d'India: Max & Bruno
 Enzo Salvi: Oscar Tufello
 Biagio Izzo: Mar. Gennaro Saltalaquaglia
 Mabel Lozano: Gianna Ciulla
 Nuria de la Fuente: Paola Rampelli
 Paolo Conticini: Capitan
 Manu Fullola: Marco Ciulla
 Lucrezia Piaggio:Lorella Ombroni 
 Iuliana Ierugan: show girl A
 Kimberly Greene: show girl B
 Gloria Anselmi: show girl C
 Luisella Tuttavilla: show girl D
 Maria De Filippi: herself

References

External links

Italian Christmas comedy films
Films directed by Neri Parenti
Films scored by Bruno Zambrini
2000s Christmas comedy films